Sun Sovannarith (born 11 February 1985) is a footballer who play as a defender for ISI Dangkor Senchey in Cambodian Second League.

He has represented Cambodia at senior international level.

Honours

Club
Phnom Penh Crown
Cambodian League:2011
2011 AFC President's Cup: Runner up

Nagacorp FC
Cambodian League: 2009
Hun Sen Cup: 2013
Boeung Ket FC 
Cambodian League:2017

International goals

References

External links
 

1987 births
Living people
Cambodian footballers
Cambodia international footballers
Preah Khan Reach Svay Rieng FC players
Association football defenders
Association football midfielders
Nagaworld FC players
Phnom Penh Crown FC players